Mangashti Amirian (3 February 1936 – 29 April 2021) was an Iranian light-heavyweight weightlifter. He placed tenth at the 1960 Summer Olympics.

References

1936 births
2021 deaths
Iranian male weightlifters
Olympic weightlifters of Iran
Weightlifters at the 1960 Summer Olympics
Sportspeople from Khuzestan province
20th-century Iranian people